Aarno Rinne (born 11 July 1941) is a Finnish footballer. He played in eight matches for the Finland national football team from 1964 to 1965.

References

1941 births
Living people
Finnish footballers
Finland international footballers
Place of birth missing (living people)
Association footballers not categorized by position